William Joseph Grevell (1898–1923) was an American Major League Baseball pitcher. He played for the Philadelphia Athletics during the  season.

References

Major League Baseball pitchers
Philadelphia Athletics players
Baseball players from New Jersey
1898 births
1923 deaths